Loop 337 is a  partial loop route around the city of New Braunfels in the U.S. state of Texas. The loop was designated in 1960. Loop 337 begins and ends at I-35 and shares a concurrency with SH 46 from the interchange at SH 46 eastward to I-35.

History
Loop 337 was first designated on June 1, 1960 as a loop around New Braunfels from I-35 southwest of New Braunfels, around the north side of the city, and ending at and intersection of US 81 and FM 25 east of the Guadalupe River.  On October 21, 1967, SH 46 was rerouted to run concurrently along the eastern half of the loop.  On February 26, 1968, the clockwise end of the loop was extended to I-35 over part of FM 25.

Route description

Loop 337 begins on the southwestern side of New Braunfels at I-35, heading north through the city predominantly as a surface street with at-grade intersections.  There are a few exceptions to this, the first being at Landa Street:  Loop 337 passes over the street and the railroad track running parallel to it; access to Landa Street is provided by way of a single ramp. After this interchange Loop 337 turns towards the northeast and into the city, where it meets SH 46 at a diamond interchange. From here and to the east, Loop 337 and SH 46 run along the northern fringes of the city limits as a concurrent, co-signed route.  As the loop turns towards the southeast, another interchange due to a railroad bridge occurs at Rock Street and Gruene Road.  After crossing the Guadalupe River, Loop 337 turns towards the south at the Common Street intersection.  The route comes to an end at I-35 on the northeastern side of the city, while SH 46 continues on to the south toward Seguin.

Junction list

References

337
Transportation in Comal County, Texas
New Braunfels, Texas